Catherine Jarrige (4 October 1754 - 4 July 1836) - known as "Catinon Menette" in her local dialect - was a French Roman Catholic and a professed member from the Third Order of Saint Dominic. Jarrige spent her childhood on her farm in Cantal until the death of her mother prompted her to begin lacemaking in Mauriac. She became a Dominican tertiary in Mauriac and began tending to the needs of the poor. The French Revolution did not hinder her charitable works but, to her care for the poor and needy, she added the protection of the priests who refused to pledge their allegiance to the new regime. She only lost one priest in her undercover efforts to protect priests and provide sacraments to loyal Catholics. That priest was François Filiol. Jarrige accompanied him to the gallows to steady him.

Jarrige's beatification was celebrated on 24 November 1996 in Saint Peter's Square. The Order of Preachers (Dominicans) celebrate her feast day on 4 July.

Life
Catherine Jarrige was born on 4 October 1754 to the poor peasants Pierre Jarrige and Maria Célarier in Doumis as the last of seven children; one sibling was her sister Toinette. Her mother died in 1767. The girl liked to pull jokes on her friends but apologized each time to them.

Jarrige worked in the fields with her parents and siblings and in 1763 was sent to work as a servant of a neighbor. There it was said that she lived a pleasant and even mischievous life. It was at this same time in 1763 that she made her First Communion which she cherished as a crucial life event. In 1774 she went to Mauriac with her sister Toinette to settle as a lacemaker. Jarrige also imitated her name patron Catherine of Siena and became a professed member of the Third Order of Saint Dominic in 1776. Jarrige liked to dance Bourrée but she renounced it and would mention while she was going around to help the poor. Her sister's wedding saw her being the first on the dance floor doing this dance though the next morning pledging never to do it again - and she never did.

Jarrige spent all her life providing for the spiritual and material needs of the poor and she went about requisitioning alms for them and inspiring the most reticent to awaken their conscience. But she was also devoted to the most humble and poorest people and looked after them through providing them with food and clothing while providing comfort to them in attentiveness to their circumstances.

The French Revolution heralded in a period of anti-religious sentiment and a surge in nationalistic fervor which began to concern her in 1791. Jarrige provided help to the priests who refused to swear an oath of allegiance to the new regime and she hid them so that the priests could celebrate Mass and she helped assist them in their work risking her life multiple times. Jarrige also procured vestments for them in secret as well as wine and wafers to celebrate Mass and managed to save all priests save for one: François Filiol. Jarrige accompanied the priest to the gallows for comfort in 1793 and after his execution took some of his blood and smeared it on the face of a blind child who was cured. The executioner saw this and began to lose composure: "I'm lost. I'm lost. I've killed a saint!". Jarrige was also arrested several times for her actions in 1794 but the authorities released her each time fearing riots since she was a popular figure.

One amusing tale has it that she disguised a priest as a peasant to smuggle him out of the area and she doused him with wine to create the illusion that he was drunk and also asking him to walk as if he were. Jarrige also asked that she be the one to do the talking if a soldier neared them which did happen though she deviated from her plan and began to berate the priest as if he were her husband. The soldier came up to them and said to the disguised priest: "Citizen if I had a wife like that I'd drown her in the nearest river" and the priest responded: "Citizen so would I!"

Jarrige died in 1836.

Beatification
The beatification process began on 12 June 1929 under Pope Pius XI and Jarrige became titled as a Servant of God while the confirmation of her life of heroic virtue on 16 January 1953 allowed for Pope Pius XII to title her as Venerable. Pope John Paul II beatified Jarrige in Saint Peter's Square on 24 November 1996 after he confirmed a miracle attributed to her.

The current postulator for this cause is the Dominican priest Vito Tomás Gómez García.

Bibliographical details
 Bienheureuse Catherine Jarrige : une amie pour marcher vers le Christ, Catinon Menette 1754-1836 - Philippe Dupuy - Éditions du Signe - 1997
 Osservatore Romano : 1996 n.45 p. 7 / n.48 p. 2-3 / n.49 p. 9-10
 ''Documentation Catholique : 1997 n.1 p. 1-2

References

External links
 Hagiography Circle
 Saints SQPN
 Santi e Beati

1754 births
1836 deaths
18th-century venerated Christians
18th-century French nuns
19th-century venerated Christians
19th-century French nuns
French beatified people
Beatifications by Pope John Paul II
Dominican tertiaries
Lay Dominicans
People from Cantal